Peabody may refer to:

Libraries 
 Peabody Institute Library (Peabody, Massachusetts), public library in Peabody, Massachusetts
 George Peabody Library, the historical library at the Peabody Institute in Baltimore
 Peabody Township Library, a city library in Peabody, Kansas

Museums 
 Peabody Essex Museum, a museum of art and culture in Salem, Massachusetts
 Peabody Historical Library Museum, in Peabody, Kansas
 Peabody Museum of Archaeology and Ethnology at Harvard University in Cambridge, Massachusetts
 Peabody Museum of Natural History at Yale University in New Haven, Connecticut
 Robert S. Peabody Museum of Archaeology at Phillips Academy in Andover, Massachusetts

Music 
 Peabody Institute, a music conservatory at Johns Hopkins University in Baltimore, Maryland
 Peabody Symphony Orchestra, a music ensemble at the Peabody Institute
 Peabody (band), Australian music group
 Peabody (dance), a fast foxtrot-type dance done to ragtime music

Places

United States
 Peabody, Indiana
 Peabody, Kansas
 Peabody Downtown Historic District
 Peabody City Park
 Peabody, Massachusetts
 Peabody Veterans Memorial High School
 Peabody, Cambridge, Massachusetts, a neighborhood
 Peabody River, in New Hampshire

Elsewhere
 Peabody Bay, Greenland

Other uses
 Peabody (surname)
 Peabody action, a type of firearm action
 Peabody Award, for radio and television journalism
 Peabody bird, the American white-throated sparrow
 Peabody Energy, an American company engaged in the production of coal
 Peabody Hotel, a hotel in Memphis, Tennessee, United States
 Peabody Picture Vocabulary Test, a type of intelligence test
 Peabody Trust, a housing association in London, now branded simply as Peabody
 Mister Peabody, a fictional dog in 1950s and 1960s television animated series
 Mr. Peabody & Sherman, a 2014 computer-animated film based on the TV series

See also 
 Peabody High School (disambiguation)